Vaishali is an elevated metro station located on the branch line of the Blue Line of the Delhi Metro in Trans-Hindon area of Ghaziabad. It serves the Ghaziabad suburbs of Vaishali, Vasundhara, Maharajpur, Indirapuram, Khora and other nearby neighborhoods and areas.

Station layout

Facilities
The station has the following facilities:

Token Vending Machine: One token vending machine on the first floor near gate number 3 
ATM: PNB ATM on the second floor's unpaid concourse
Food/Restaurant: Burger King on the first floor near gate number 3 and Yamient Bite on the ground floor near gate number 2
Toilet: 2 Sulabh Toilets- One near the frisking point and the second on the ground floor near gate number 2
Lounge/Party Hall: Hollywood Dreams and Rudraksh Banquet party halls on the ground floor

Exits

See also

References

External links

 Delhi Metro Rail Corporation Ltd. (Official site) 
 Delhi Metro Annual Reports
 
 UrbanRail.Net – descriptions of all metro systems in the world, each with a schematic map showing all stations.

Delhi Metro stations
Railway stations in India opened in 2011
Railway stations in Ghaziabad district, India